Millat Nagar is a neighbourhood in District South of Karachi, Pakistan.

There are several ethnic groups in Millat Nagar including Muhajirs, Sindhis, Punjabis, Kashmiris, Seraikis, Pakhtuns, Balochis, Memons, Bohras and Ismailis.

Main areas 
 Dharam Siwara
 Azeem Plaza Area
 Shoe Market
 Bhatti Compound
 Haq Nagar
 Hashim Khan Baghicha
 Zoological Garden

See also 
 Islam Pura

References

External links 
 Karachi Website

Neighbourhoods of Karachi
Saddar Town